Long Branch is a  long 1st order tributary to Toms Dam Branch in Sussex County, Delaware.

Course
Long Branch rises about 0.5 miles northeast of Greenwood, Delaware and then flows south to join Toms Dam Branch about 1 mile southeast of St. Johnstown.

Watershed
Long Branch drains  of area, receives about 45.2 in/year of precipitation, has a topographic wetness index of 830.08 and is about 7% forested.

See also
List of Delaware rivers

References

Rivers of Delaware
Rivers of Sussex County, Delaware
Tributaries of the Nanticoke River